The Douglass family is a prominent American family originating from Cordova, Maryland, United States. It was founded by the politician and activist Frederick Douglass.

History
Born Frederick Augustus Washington Bailey, Frederick Douglass assumed the surname from the poem The Lady of the Lake (1810) by Sir Walter Scott after his escape from slavery to hide from his former master. He did this as a result of the proposal of a friend. As he explains in his first autobiography:

His family would later go on to become a part of the African-American upper class, continuing to provide leadership and intermarrying with descendants of the African-American educationist and political kingmaker Booker T. Washington.

Members in selection
Frederick Douglass (c.1818–1895), statesman, writer
Anna Murray Douglass (1813–1882) abolitionist, first wife of Frederick Douglass
 Rosetta Douglass-Sprague (1839–1906), teacher and activist
Fredericka Douglass Sprague Perry (1872–1943), philanthropist
Lewis Henry Douglass (1840–1908), soldier
Frederick Douglass, Jr. (1842–1892), abolitionist, essayist, newspaper editor, soldier
Charles Remond Douglass (1844–1920), soldier, clerk
Joseph Douglass (1871–1935), musician
Helen Pitts Douglass (1838–1903), suffragist, second wife of Frederick Douglass

See also

List of things named after Frederick Douglass
Frederick Douglass Memorial
Frederick Douglass National Historic Site
Frederick Douglass Memorial Bridge

References